The Hong Kong national under-19 cricket team represents the Special Administrative Region of China in international under-19 cricket. It has qualified for the Under-19 Cricket World Cup on one occasion, in 2010.

History
Hong Kong was originally part of the ICC East Asia-Pacific region, and finished runner-up to Papua New Guinea u19 for the 2001 EAP Under-19 Cricket Trophy.

At the 2009 Under-19 Cricket World Cup Qualifier in Canada, the team placed sixth overall to become the last team to qualify for the 2010 Under-19 Cricket World Cup in New Zealand. They won only three out of nine games at the tournament, finishing above Uganda u19 and Netherlands u19 on net run rate. Irfan Ahmed was the team's leading run-scorer at the qualifier.

Jamie Atkinson was named as the squad's captain for the 2010 World Cup. The team failed to win a game in the first round, losing to England u19, India u19 and Afghanistan u19 (also in its first World Cup). The team was bowled out on each occasion but did not disgrace itself. Later, in the plate stage, Hong Kong lost to Bangladesh u19 but then got revenge over Afghanistan, defeating them by four wickets. In the final game, the 13th place play-off, Hong Kong lost heavily to Zimbabwe u19, being bowled out for 98 to record its lowest score of the tournament.

For the 2019 ACC Under-19 Eastern Region tournament, former national team player Jawaid Iqbal was appointed as the coach. As of 2020, there was a national under-19 50-over cup used to select the national team squad.

Under-19 World Cup record

References 

1988 establishments in Hong Kong
Hong Kong
Under19
Cricket clubs established in 1988